Black Beauty is a 1971 British drama film directed by James Hill and based on Anna Sewell's 1877 novel of the same name. It is the fourth feature film adaptation of Anna Sewell's story. Lionel Bart provided the rousing score.

The film's cast includes Walter Slezak, Mark Lester, Uschi Glas, Patrick Mower and John Nettleton.

Plot

Black Beauty is a stallion who, as a foal in England c. 1856, is born in front of a boy named Joe to whom it is given by his father. He is taken by a brutal squire, who takes over Joe's family farm when the bank forecloses on the loan. After the squire is killed, he is acquired by Irish Travellers. After a horse race and fist fight to determine leadership, Black Beauty runs away but is captured by a horse trader who then sells him to a Spanish circus.

In the circus, he learns many tricks before being given to Sir William, an arrogant British military man; and then is passed to Sir William's daughter Anne.  Anne's fiancé is Lt. Gervaise Caldicott, a half French half English hussar officer whom Sir William falsely accuses of being a coward and unworthy of his daughter's hand. When Gervaise volunteers for overseas active military service to prove his bravery his fiancée gives him Black Beauty as his steed.

Black Beauty then travels to the Northwest Frontier (scenes were shot in Spain), where Gervaise is killed in battle (one possibly based on the Russian presence in India and Afghanistan c. 1860).

Because of his bravery in battle, the horse is shipped back to England, but is then sold by Gervaise's comrade in arms, now a penniless and alcoholic army officer. The horse is used for hauling coal by another heartless owner, but acquires pneumonia. At his most sick, he is rescued by a friendly old woman who runs a farm for retired horses and her employee, some time after 1870. The employee turns out to be the boy named Joe whom Black Beauty knew when he was a foal, while the woman was Anna Sewell (author of the original Black Beauty book).

Cast
 Mark Lester as Joe Evans
 Walter Slezak as Hackenschmidt
 Uschi Glas as Marie Hackenschmidt (credited as "Ursula Glas")
 Peter Lee Lawrence as Lt. Gervaise Caldicott
 Patrick Mower as Sam Greene
 John Nettleton as Sir William
 Maria Rohm as Lady Anne Piggott
 Eddie Golden as Evans, Joe's Father
 Clive Geraghty as Roger
 John Hoey as Muldoon
 Patrick Gardiner as Seamus O'Flaherty
 Brian McGrath as Mark Beauchamp
 Ronan Smith as Farmboy
 John Franklyn as Coalman
 Margaret Lacey as Anna Sewell

Filming
The film was shot on location in Ireland and Spain.

Reception

Roger Ebert was overall complimentary of the film, and believed the re-telling of the book remained true to the original aims of the author, although changing the actual biography of the horse. According to Ebert, James Hill's version of Black Beauty is "more than just an animal movie." Ebert was also generally complimentary of the human actors, although he panned the performance of Mark Lester as Joe. He gave the film three out of four stars. A review in The New York Times also commented on the major plot changes, but called the movie "uncommonly interesting, handsome and sometimes quite marvelously inventive". The review praised the atmosphere of the movie and the performances of several actors in secondary roles, but called the performances of Mark Lester and Walter Slezak "utterly pedestrian".

References

External links
 
 

1971 films
British children's drama films
Films directed by James Hill (British director)
Paramount Pictures films
Films set in 1856
Films set in the 1860s
Films set in the 1870s
Films shot in Spain
Films based on Black Beauty
1970s children's drama films
Films with screenplays by Wolf Mankowitz
1970s English-language films
1970s British films